The Micronesian Championships in athletics records are the best marks set by athletes who are representing one of the member states of the Micronesian Championships Council during the correspondent athletics event which began in 2003.

Men

Women

Mixed

References

External links

Micronesian Championships in Athletics
Micronesian Championships